Vretsia is an abandoned Turkish Cypriot village in the Paphos District of Cyprus, located  east of Koilineia. 
After the 1974 Turkish invasion of Cyprus, Turkish-Cypriot natives of the village abandoned their properties and moved to the north of Cyprus.

Notable Individuals
 Özker Özgür, pro-unification Turkish-Cypriot politician and parliamentarian.
 Dr. İhsan Ali, Turkish-Cypriot diplomat and advisor to Archbishop Makarios.
 Prof. Dr. Salih Karaali, Professor of Astronomy at the Istanbul University.
 Assist. Prof. Dr. Umit Ilhan, Assist. Professor of Computer Engineering at the Near East University.
 Dr. Soydan Redif, Professor of Electrical & Electronic Engineering at the European University of Lefke.
 Ramadan Guney, British-Turkish Cypriot businessman and politician.

References

Communities in Paphos District